The 2014 Boise State Broncos football team represented Boise State University in the 2014 NCAA Division I FBS football season. The Broncos were led by first-year head coach Bryan Harsin and played their home games at Albertsons Stadium. They were members of the Mountain West Conference in the Mountain Division. They finished the season 12–2, 7–1 in Mountain West play to win the Mountain Division championship. They defeated West Division champion Fresno State in the Mountain West Championship Game to become Mountain West champions. As the highest ranked team from the "Group of five", they received an automatic bid to a New Year's Six bowl. They were invited to the Fiesta Bowl where they defeated Arizona. It was the Broncos third appearance and victory in the Fiesta Bowl.

Schedule

Schedule Source:

Game summaries

vs. Ole Miss

Colorado State

at UConn

The first meeting between the two schools ended with Boise taking the win. Boise State would take the early lead with a fumble recovery from Tanner Vallejo for a touchdown. Boise State would trail in the second quarter 7–10, but Boise State QB Grant Hedrick would throw a touchdown pass to Matt Miller to take the lead again. UConn would close the gap to 3 points in the third quarter and headed into the fourth quarter trailing by 3, but Jonathan Moxey made a key fourth quarter interception, stepping in front of UConn's Deshon Foxx at the UConn 37-yard line. That led to a 9-yard touchdown pass from Hedrick to Miller in the back of the end zone. Boise State would get their second interception with four minutes left in the fourth quarter, this time by Donte Deayon who ripped the ball from receiver Geremy Davis and ran 50 yards down the right sideline for the score thus sealing a 38–21 Boise State victory.

Louisiana–Lafayette

at Air Force

at Nevada

Fresno State

BYU

at New Mexico

San Diego State

at Wyoming

Utah State

Fresno State–Mountain West Championship Game

Arizona–Fiesta Bowl

Rankings

Statistics

Scores by quarter

References

Boise State
Boise State Broncos football seasons
Mountain West Conference football champion seasons
Fiesta Bowl champion seasons
Boise State Broncos football